The Batak Reservoir is located in the Rhodope Mountains and is the third largest in Bulgaria. It attracts many tourists and fishermen, and the resort Tsigov Chark was built on its shore. The lake is situated around 8 km away from the historic town of Batak from which it took its name. Additionally, in close proximity are the cities of Rakitivo (14 km) and Velingrad (24 km). The Batak reservoir is located in the Batak municipality and within the Pazardzhik province.
The dam is positioned at around 1,100 m above the sea level. The reservoir area is surrounded by mountain and forest areas.

There is a hydro-electric power plant constructed in Batak, that is among other sources powered by water coming from the Batak reservoir area.

Footnotes

External links

Reservoirs in Bulgaria
Landforms of Pazardzhik Province
Rhodope Mountains